The 2020 Le Samyn was the 52nd edition of the Le Samyn road cycling one day race in Belgium. It was part of the 2020 UCI Europe Tour as a 1.1-rated event that started in Quaregnon and finished in Dour.

Teams
Twenty-five teams, consisting of six UCI WorldTeams, ten UCI ProTeams, and nine UCI Continental teams participated in the race. Most teams entered with seven riders; however, and  only entered six, and  only entered five. 101 of the 169 riders in the race finished.

UCI WorldTeams

 
 
 
 
 
 

UCI ProTeams

 
 
 
 
 
 
 
 
 
 

UCI Continental Teams

Result

References

External links 
  

Le Samyn
Le Samyn
March 2020 sports events in Belgium